The 1614 battle of the Kizugawa(木津川の戦い) was one of a number of battles surrounding the siege of Osaka, in which the Tokugawa shogunate destroyed the Toyotomi clan, the last major opposition to its control of Japan.

A fortress loyal to the Toyotomi controlled a section of the Kizu River (Kizugawa) near Osaka. After a shogunal reconnaissance mission, a pair of amphibious assaults were launched to seize it. Ishikawa Tadafusa led 2300 men across the river on boats from the west while other groups under the command of Hachisuka Yoshishige attacked from the south and east.

The assaults were successful, and the fortress fell to the Tokugawa forces.

References
Turnbull, Stephen (1998). 'The Samurai Sourcebook'. London: Cassell & Co. p255.

Kizugawa 1614
1614 in Japan
Kizugawa